In Sufism, the Wazifa Zarruqiyya is a regular litany (wazifa) practiced by followers in the Shadhili order, and whose initial title is "Salvation ship for those who resort to God".

Presentation 
This wazifa was initiated and compiled by the Maliki and Sufi theologian Ahmad Zarruq (1442–1493 CE) in order to train his followers (murids) to recite morning and evening litanies on a daily basis.

This Sunni Ashari Muslim scholar and Sufi Sheikh has assembled in this duty of recitation a panoply of Quranic verses and prophetic duas dedicated to the morning and night litanies to which the murid must assiduously submit.

The components of this wazifa were taken from the "Chapter of the morning and evening Adhkar" in the book written by Imam Al-Nawawi (1233–1277 CE) and titled "".

This wazifa is part of the theological work of Imam Ahmad Zarruq who is one of the most eminent scholars of the school of Maliki fiqh, but he is better known as a Shadhili Sufi Sheikh and as the founder of the Zarruqiyya branch of the Shadhiliyya Sufi order Tariqa.

This notable Sufi who studied in Béjaïa is well known in the Muslim world because around his teachings was born the Sufi order of Zarruqiyya.

This scholar has succeeded in this wazifa using a synthesis of fiqh and Sufism as a feature of the litanies in the Maghreb region, and he has the well known quote which states that:

Practice 
This wazifa is recited individually or collectively after Fajr prayer in the morning and after Asr prayer in the afternoon.
The recitation begins with the pronunciation of Ta'awwudh then of Basmala followed by Āyah 163 of Surah al-Baqarah.

Next comes the tilawa of Āyah 1 from Surah Al Imran, followed by Āyah 111 of Surah Ta-Ha and then the Throne verse.

Several verses follow each other in the recitation with a specific repetition for each of them. Then the murid recites authentic duas related by Muhammad, and relating to the morning and evening as well as to personal and congregational well-being.

The content of the wazifa is finally completed with the recitation of the last three verses Āyates 180 to 182 of Surah As-Saaffat.

See also 
 Wazifa
 Dua
 Dhikr
 Wird
 Al-Nawawi
 Ahmad Zarruq
 Shadhiliyya

External links

References 

Sufism
Spiritual practice
Language and mysticism
Arabic words and phrases
Islamic belief and doctrine
Islamic terminology